Copper Canyon is a town in Denton County, Texas, United States. The population was 1,731 in 2020. Copper Canyon is adjacent to the master-planned Lantana residential development.

History
The first European settlement in the area that would become Copper Canyon occurred in the 1840s. One of the more prominent settler families was that of Elisha and Mary Chinn, who came to Texas from their original home in North Carolina in 1852. They helped establish the first church in the area, a log-cabin chapel which eventually became known as the Chinn's Chapel Methodist Church. The church is still active on what is now known as Chinn Chapel Road.

The town gradually grew with cattle ranching as the mainstay of the local economy. The railroad came to the area in 1881, and the first public school was constructed in 1884. The town apparently got its name from "Copperhead Canyon," a part of the area formerly known for venomous snakes. Population, never large, generally stagnated or declined in the first half of the twentieth century. After World War II the area's rural charm slowly began to attract residents from the more crowded parts of the Dallas/Fort Worth metroplex.

The town was formally incorporated in 1973. Although still rather sparsely populated, the town has grown as part of the general development of areas north of the Dallas/Fort Worth International Airport. Census Bureau figures tell the story: 465 (1980), 978 (1990), 1,216 (2000), 1,334 (2010). Traditional ranches are still found in the area, but Copper Canyon has become primarily a bedroom community with little commercial development.

Geography

Copper Canyon is located at  (33.098814, –97.094646).

Demographics

As of the 2020 United States census, there were 1,731 people, 553 households, and 513 families residing in the town.

Local notes
The Town of Copper Canyon is served by the Lewisville and Denton Independent School Districts.

The town contracts with neighboring communities for most municipal services, such as fire protection from Argyle Fire Department, police services from Denton County Sheriff's Department, and ambulance service from Lewisville. The town boasts of a low tax rate and a number of horse trails maintained for local riders.

Copper Canyon is also home to the Old Alton Bridge, a registered national historic site. Purportedly haunted, it is locally known as the "Goatman's Bridge".

Education
Most of Copper Canyon is in the Lewisville Independent School District, while a portion to the west is in the Denton Independent School District.

Most of Denton ISD Copper Canyon is zoned to Adkins Elementary School, while small parcels are zoned to Blanton Elementary School. All of the Denton ISD part is zoned to Harpool Middle School, and Guyer High School.

Notable people

 Dick Armey, former U.S. Representative from Texas'  (1985–2003) and House Majority Leader (1995–2003)

References

External links
 Town of Copper Canyon official website

Dallas–Fort Worth metroplex
Towns in Denton County, Texas
Towns in Texas
Populated places established in 1973